Clyde–Green Springs Schools, officially the Clyde–Green Springs Exempted Village School District, is a public school district in southeastern Sandusky County and northern Seneca County, Ohio, United States, that mainly serves the cities of Clyde and Green Springs and the surrounding area. District offices are located in Clyde and the district includes one high school, one middle school, and two elementary schools.

Facilities

Elementary schools
 Clyde Elementary School (Clyde)
 Green Springs Elementary School (Green Springs)

Middle schools
 McPherson Middle School (Clyde)

High schools
 Clyde High School (Clyde)

Incidents

School district treasury theft
On January 22, 2010, former superintendent Todd Helms, who was superintendent from 2002 until 2008, was charged with stealing $295,081 from the district. He pleaded guilty and received a sentence of 8 years in prison and restitution.

On May 13, 2015, Helms was released, after serving five years of his original sentence, due to factors including "the nonviolent nature of his offenses and the fact that he's paid a substantial amount of the restitution he [owed]." As of May 17, 2015, Helms still owed $32,500.

References

School districts in Ohio
Education in Sandusky County, Ohio